Lassul Bay is a bay of East New Britain Province, Papua New Guinea, opening into the Bismarck Sea. It is located in the north-western part of New Britain, to the west of Ataliklikun Bay on the Gazelle Peninsula. The communities around Lassul Bay are incorporated into the twenty-one wards of the Lassul-Baining Local-Level Government (LLG) including the settlement of Lassul. The land around the shoreline is swampy and the area has a history of plantation cultivation. The area was invaded in February 1942 by the Japanese during the Battle of Rabaul.

References

External links
Google Earth

Bays of New Britain
East New Britain Province